The 1824 United States presidential election in North Carolina took place between October 26 and December 2, 1824, as part of the 1824 United States presidential election. Voters chose 15 representatives, or electors to the Electoral College, who voted for President and Vice President.

During this election, the Democratic-Republican Party was the only major national party, and four different candidates from this party sought the Presidency. North Carolina voted for Andrew Jackson over William H. Crawford, Henry Clay, and John Quincy Adams. Jackson won North Carolina by a margin of 12.77%.

Results

References

North Carolina
1824
1824 North Carolina elections